Mecas cana is a species of longhorn beetles found in North America. It was described by Newman in 1840.

Subspecies
 Mecas cana saturnina (LeConte, 1859)
 Mecas cana cana (Newman, 1840)

References

Saperdini
Beetles described in 1840